Padungan is a state constituency in Sarawak, Malaysia, that has been represented in the Sarawak State Legislative Assembly since 1979.

The state constituency was created in the 1977 redistribution and is mandated to return a single member to the Sarawak State Legislative Assembly under the first past the post voting system.

History
2006–2016: The constituency contains the polling districts of Market, Bazaar, Padungan, Abell, Deshon, Sekama, Bukit Tuan, Kinyang, Ellis, Ban Hock, Lumba Kuda, Central, Petanak.

2016–present: The constituency contains the polling districts of Market, Bazaar, Padungan, Abell, Deshon, Sekama, Bukit Tuan, Kinyang, Ellis, Ban Hock, Lumba Kuda, Central, Petanak.

Representation history

Election results

References

Sarawak state constituencies